The Eagle Island lighthouses were a pair of lighthouses on Eagle Island, County Mayo, Ireland, of which only one remains.

Two lighthouses were commissioned in 1830 in response to requests from the Coastguards who were concerned at the sea conditions at Blackrock, further south. The lighthouses became operational in September 1835.

Eagle Island is located close to the edge of the Continental Shelf and is constantly pounded by powerful waves from the Atlantic.  When the lighthouses were first built in the 19th century there were two lighthouses and seven dwelling houses on Eagle Island, according to the 1841 census.  By the 1911 census there was only one dwelling house listed on the island.  Despite the erection of a massive storm wall to protect the lighthouses, one of the lighthouses was destroyed by the severe storms and its remains still litter the ground it used to stand on.

On 11 March 1861 at midday the light room of the East tower was struck by a rogue wave, smashing 23 panes, washing some of the lamps down the stairs, and damaging the reflectors with broken glass beyond repair. The light was restored the following night with a reduced number of lamps and reflectors. So much water cascaded down the tower in the incident that it was impossible for the keepers to open the door at the base, and they had to drill holes in it to let the water out.

Storms constantly batter the lighthouse at Eagle Island and gradually it was realised that Eagle Island was not well suited to human habitation.  The families on the island were rehoused near to Corclough on the mainland at the end of the 19th century, although lighthouse keepers remained resident.  On 31 March 1988 the lighthouse was made automatic and there have been no lighthouse keepers resident on the island since.

See also

 List of lighthouses in Ireland

Notes

External links
 Eagle Island photos
 A Flickr photo
Commissioners of Irish Lights

Lighthouses completed in 1830
Lighthouses in the Republic of Ireland
Buildings and structures in County Mayo
1830 establishments in Ireland
Lighthouses on the National Inventory of Architectural Heritage